River Bourgeois  is a small community in the Canadian province of Nova Scotia, located in Richmond County on Cape Breton Island. Despite the name, there is an excellent harbour but no river. It is the hometown of former NHL player Mike McPhee.

The talented fiddler Tara Lynne Touesnard was born in River Bourgeois, and is buried there.

River Bourgeois is historically a Catholic Acadien community with a long history of fishing.

References

External links
River Bourgeois on Destination Nova Scotia

Communities in Richmond County, Nova Scotia
General Service Areas in Nova Scotia